The Roe River runs from Giant Springs to the Missouri River near Great Falls, Montana, United States.

History
A successful campaign to get the Roe River recognized by the Guinness World Records as the shortest river in the world originated in 1987 with fifth-grade students of teacher Susie Nardlinger at Lincoln Elementary School in Great Falls. The river was unnamed at the time, so the students first had to petition the United States Board on Geographic Names to accept their proposed name, Roe River, then submit their proposal to Guinness. The children's name likely came from the Giant Springs Trout Hatchery adjoining the springs and which receives  of spring water per minute used in primarily raising rainbow trout from their own roe (eggs).  In 1988 future NFL football player Dallas Neil, then a student at the school, put in an appearance on The Tonight Show as part of this effort.

This title was contested in 1989 when Guinness named the Roe River as the world's shortest.

At that time, Lincoln City's Chamber of Commerce described the Roe as a "drainage ditch surveyed for a school project".

Guinness apparently never ruled on the dispute, leaving the claim by the Roe stand, but instead chose to no longer list a shortest river, possibly as a result of this ongoing dispute.

See also

List of rivers of Montana

References

External links
MontanaKids.com article on Roe River
Giant Springs State Park Montana State Parks

Rivers of Montana
Tributaries of the Missouri River
Rivers of Cascade County, Montana